Fabio Ochoa may refer to:

 Fabio Ochoa Restrepo (1923–2002), father, Colombian rancher and patriarch of a notorious crime family associated with the Medellín Cartel
 Fabio Ochoa Vásquez (born 1957), son, convicted drug trafficker and former ranking member of the Medellín Cartel